The canton of Creney-près-Troyes is an administrative division of the Aube department, northeastern France. It was created at the French canton reorganisation which came into effect in March 2015. Its seat is in Creney-près-Troyes.

It consists of the following communes:
 
Bessy
Boulages
Champfleury
Chapelle-Vallon
Charny-le-Bachot
Châtres
Chauchigny
Creney-près-Troyes
Droupt-Saint-Basle
Droupt-Sainte-Marie
Étrelles-sur-Aube
Fontaine-les-Grès
Les Grandes-Chapelles
Lavau
Longueville-sur-Aube
Mergey
Méry-sur-Seine
Mesgrigny
Plancy-l'Abbaye
Prémierfait
Rhèges
Rilly-Sainte-Syre
Saint-Benoît-sur-Seine
Sainte-Maure
Saint-Mesmin
Saint-Oulph
Salon
Savières
Vailly
Vallant-Saint-Georges
Viâpres-le-Petit
Villacerf
Villechétif

References

Cantons of Aube